Irene Doukaina Laskarina was empress consort (tsaritsa) of Bulgaria (1258–1268). She was the second wife of Tsar Constantine Tikh of Bulgaria.

She was a daughter of Emperor Theodore II Laskaris of Nicaea, and his wife Elena of Bulgaria, and sister of Nicaean Emperor John IV Laskaris. Her maternal grandparents were Tsar Ivan Asen II and Anna Maria of Hungary.

In 1257, Irene married Bulgarian nobleman Constantine Tikh as his second wife. Her husband was a pretender to the Bulgarian crown. Constantine was proud to be married to a granddaughter of Tsar Ivan Asen II, and he adopted the Bulgarian dynastic name Asen to enhance his claim to the crown. In the next year Constantine was elected Tsar of Bulgaria by a boyar council in Tarnovo and Irene become his consort.

In 1261 Irene's young brother, Emperor John IV Laskaris, was deposed and blinded by Nicaean regent Michael VIII Palaiologos, who had just regained Constantinople from the Latin Empire, re-establishing the Byzantine Empire. Tsaritsa Irene was a bitter enemy of the usurper. She became a leader of the anti-Byzantine party in the Bulgarian court.

Irene died in 1268. She had no children.

Ancestors

Sources 

 

Bulgarian consorts
13th-century births
1268 deaths
Daughters of Byzantine emperors
13th-century Bulgarian women
13th-century Byzantine women